Crohamhurst is a rural locality in the Sunshine Coast Region, Queensland, Australia.

In 1893, Crohamhurst recorded  of rain in one day during the passage of a cyclone, which is the record highest 24-hour rainfall in Australia.

Geography
Most of the southern boundary is marked by the Stanley River.  The north of Crohamhurst is protected within a section of the Glass House Mountains National Park. Also in the area is the Crohamhurst State Forest, Candle Mountain and Mount Blanc.

History
In 1893, Crohamhurst recorded  of rain in one day during the passage of a cyclone, which is the record highest 24-hour rainfall in Australia. The recording was taken by a recently departed employee of the Queensland Meteorological Service Inigo Owen Jones. The 20-year-old Jones, later became a controversial climate forecaster, believing that weather patterns were influenced by electromagnetic effects of far away planets.

Crohamhurst State School opened on 21 July 1913. It closed on 14 October 1960. It was located on Crohamhurst Road on land donated by Owen Jones (father of Inigo Owen Jones) which is now within the Crohamhurst State Forest, land donated by Inigo Owen Jones. The location of the school is marked with a sign by the road.

At the  Crohamhurst recorded a population of 203.

Heritage listings
Crohamhurst has a number of heritage-listed sites, including:
 131 Crohamhurst Road: former Crohamhurst Observatory

Notable residents

 Inigo Owen Jones, long-range weather forecaster

References

Further reading 

  — available online

Suburbs of the Sunshine Coast Region
Localities in Queensland